Irving Nattrass (born 20 December 1952) is an English former footballer who played primarily as a right back for Newcastle and Middlesbrough.

Born in Fishburn, England, Nattrass attended Ferryhill Grammar School and signed with Newcastle at age 16 on an apprenticeship.

As a youth player Nattrass lacked confidence and made slow progress within the club, even going so far as to look for employment elsewhere as a mechanic. However, he soon found his stride and went on to sign professionally for the club in July 1970, aged 17. A year later Nattrass went on to make his debut against Derby.

The then Newcastle manager Joe Harvey once commented "Nattrass is my Paul Madeley and I can't pay him a bigger compliment than that". Madeley was a Leeds and England player who was dubbed the "Rolls-Royce" of footballers.
 
Hampered by injuries and disagreements with the Newcastle board he eventually moved to Middlesbrough for the sum of £375,000. Nattrass made his league debut for them against Arsenal on 15 September 1979.

Nattrass is now a successful businessman and keen golfer.

Footnotes

External links
Sporting Heroes Irving Nattrass record and photo
Evening Chronicle Interview with Irving Nattrass
Toonarama Irving Nattrass Biography
Image

1952 births
Living people
Footballers from County Durham
English footballers
England under-23 international footballers
Association football midfielders
Newcastle United F.C. players
Middlesbrough F.C. players
English Football League players